Eileen Dickinson (born October 8, 1949) is an American politician who has served in the Vermont House of Representatives since 2009.

References

1949 births
Living people
Republican Party members of the Vermont House of Representatives
People from Teaneck, New Jersey
Women state legislators in Vermont
21st-century American politicians
21st-century American women politicians